Joe M. O'Connell is an American novelist, documentary filmmaker, short story writer, photographer and journalist based in Austin, Texas.

Considered an expert on the Texas film scene, O'Connell wrote columns about the Texas film industry that appeared in the Austin American-Statesman from 2000 to 2004 (titled "On Location"), in the Dallas Morning News from 2005 to 2011 (as "Shot in Texas") and in The Austin Chronicle from 2004 to 2009 (as "Film News.") His film articles also have been published regularly in the San Antonio Express-News since 1997 and nationally in Variety. He has also contributed to Texas Monthly.

His documentary film Love and Other Stunts examines the life of B-movie stuntman Gary Kent. In 2017 he was at work on a second documentary titled Rondo and Bob about Robert A. Burns, the art director for The Texas Chain Saw massacre, and his obsession with actor Rondo Hatton.

Born in Austin, Texas, to noted architect William R. O'Connell and nurse Wylma Castleberry O'Connell Ruelke, Joe was raised mainly in Austin, but lived briefly in Northglenn, Colorado, and India. He then went to Southwest Texas State University and received a degree in journalism in 1984. O'Connell worked as a newspaper reporter/editor in various cities around Texas, concentrating on covering government and politics. He later returned to SWT (now known as Texas State University) to earn an MFA in creative writing in 1995 while working long distance with the late, famed short-story writer Andre Dubus.

His first novel, Evacuation Plan, centered in a residential hospice was published in 2007 by Dalton Publishing, won the North Texas Book Festival Award in fiction, and was a finalist for the Violet Crown Book Award given by the Writers' League of Texas. O'Connell's short stories have taken first prize at both the Deep South Writers Conference and the Louzelle Rose Barclay Awards, and have been published in literary journals including The G.W. Review, Confrontation, Lullwater Review and Other Voices.

O'Connell currently teaches writing at St. Edward's University and Austin Community College. He lives outside Austin, Texas, with his wife and young son.

References

External links
 personal page of Joe M. O'Connell
 review of novel Evacuation Plan
 Author interview about Evacuation Plan
 articles by O'Connell in The Austin Chronicle
 film reviews in Rotten Tomatoes
 O'Connell writing about photography

21st-century American novelists
American male novelists
American male journalists
Writers from Austin, Texas
American film critics
Living people
Year of birth missing (living people)
American male short story writers
21st-century American short story writers
21st-century American male writers
Novelists from Texas
21st-century American non-fiction writers
St. Edward's University faculty
Texas State University alumni